Arsinoë (from Greek Ἀρσινόη Arsĭnŏē), minor planet designation 404 Arsinoë, is a large main-belt asteroid. It is classified as a C-type asteroid and is probably composed of carbonaceous material.

It was discovered by Auguste Charlois on June 20, 1895, in Nice.

References

External links
 
 

Mitidika asteroids
Arsinoe
Arsinoe
C-type asteroids (Tholen)
Ch-type asteroids (SMASS)
18950620